Mustang Country is a 1976 Western film directed by John C. Champion.  It stars American actor Joel McCrea, and was his last major film. It co-stars Robert Fuller, Patrick Wayne, and Nika Mina.

Plot summary
The film, set in 1925 along the Montana-Canada border, is about a rancher and former rodeo star named Dan (Joel McCrea) and his rottweiler Luke. While trying to capture an elusive mustang nicknamed "Shoshone", Dan comes across a runaway boy from an American Indian boarding school.  A friendship soon grows and the two set out to catch the wild stallion together.

Cast
Joel McCrea: Dan
Robert Fuller: Griff
Patrick Wayne: Tee Jay
Nika Mina: Nika. There is no record of this indigenous American young actor making further movies.

Awards
In 1976, the film won a Western Heritage Trustees Award for outstanding family entertainment in a western motion picture.

References

External links

1976 Western (genre) films
1976 films
Films about horses
American Western (genre) films
Films scored by Lee Holdridge
Neo-Western films
Universal Pictures films
1970s English-language films
1970s American films